George Schlieps (1894-1977) was a Russian violin maker/ Luthier (of German origins), who came from a family of musicians.

Born in St. Petersburg, Russia. His uncle was the illustrious composer Alexander Glazunov.

While in Russia, studied law and made cabinets as a hobby. Studied violin making with Ernst Geisser. Worked in Viipuri, Finland and operated a shop in Helsinki.

Was appointed Luthier to the  Sibelius Academy in 1936. Worked in Stockholm and in Estonia in 1939. Moved to Berlin in 1940 and worked as the official repairman for the Berlin Philharmonic Orchestra.

He moved to Bridgend in 1947, establishing a violin-making school and manufacturing facility for the British government and trained disabled soldiers to make violins.

After World War II (in 1950), the Schlieps' family (George, Alma, Mira and Armin) immigrated to New York City, where George and his son  Armin, both violinmakers, were invited to work for Rembert Wurlitzer as restorers.

Soon after in 1952, established their own shop  in Carnegie Hall.

George made about 250 instruments.
After George's death in 1977, Armin Schlieps (the son)  (b. 1931 - d. 2005) also an illustrious bow maker (Archetier), moved to Seattle where he ran a successful   shop since then.
Armin was trained in the Wurlitzer shop in New York and became widely known for his repair work in the Seattle area from 1970 onward. He made instruments and over 200 bows as of 1986.
He died in 2005.

References

 
Drawings of Bows by Famous Bowmakers by Armin Schlieps (1985)
John H. Fairfield - Known Violin Makers
Loan Exhibition Stringed Instruments and Bows NYV 1966 (commemorating the 70th birthday of Simone Fernando Sacconi).

1894 births
1977 deaths
Russian luthiers
Businesspeople from Saint Petersburg
Businesspeople from Helsinki
Businesspeople from New York City